The 1998 England rugby union tour of Australasia and South Africa was a series of matches played in June and July 1998 by England national rugby union team.

Matches

The tour is often referred to in rugby culture as "The Tour of Hell" due to the number of heavy defeats suffered by the England team. This was caused principally because England fielded a roster of untested and uncapped players.

Scores and results list England's points tally first.

Touring party

Manager: Clive Woodward
Assistant Manager: 
Captain: Matt Dawson

Full-back
Tim Stimpson (Newcastle Falcons), Matt Perry (Bath), Nick Beal (Northampton Saints)

Utilities
Josh Lewsey (Wasps), Spencer Brown (Richmond), Austin Healey (Leicester Tigers)

Wingers
Tom Beim (Sale Sharks), Matt Moore (Sale Sharks), Paul Sampson (Wasps)

Centres
Stuart Potter (Leicester Tigers), Dominic Chapman (Richmond), Steve Ravenscroft (Saracens)

Fly-halves
Jonny Wilkinson (Newcastle Falcons), Alex King (Wasps), Jos Baxendell (Sale Sharks).

Scrum-halves
Matt Dawson (Northampton Saints), Scott Benton (Gloucester), Peter Richards (London Irish)

Loose-forwards
Tony Diprose (Saracens), Steve Ojomoh (Bath), Richard Pool-Jones (Stade Francais Paris), Ben Sturnham (Saracens), Ben Clarke (Richmond), Pat Sanderson (Sale Sharks), Lewis Moody (Leicester Tigers).

Locks
Dave Sims (Gloucester), Rob Fidler (Gloucester), Garath Archer (Newcastle Falcons), Danny Grewcock (Saracens)

Props
Phil Vickery (Gloucester), Will Green (Wasps), Darren Crompton (Richmond), Graham Rowntree (Leicester Tigers), Duncan Bell (Sale Sharks), Tony Windo (Gloucester).

Hookers
Richard Cockerill (Leicester Tigers), Phil Greening (Gloucester), George Chuter (Saracens)

References

1998 rugby union tours
Tour
1998
1998
1998
1998 in New Zealand rugby union
1998 in South African rugby union
1998 in Australian rugby union